Pat O'Hara Wood defeated Ronald Thomas 6–3, 4–6, 6–8, 6–1, 6–3 in the final to win the men's singles tennis title at the 1920 Australasian Championships.

Draw

Key
 Q = Qualifier
 WC = Wild card
 LL = Lucky loser
 r = Retired

Top half

Bottom half

External links
  Grand Slam Tennis Archive – Australasian Open 1920
 

Australasian Championships - Men's Singles
Singles